Marianna Salchinger (born 20 January 1974) is a former Austrian alpine skier two-time winner of the FIS Alpine Ski Europa Cup (1997 and 1998).

World Cup results
Top 10

Europa Cup results
Salchinger has won two overall Europa Cup and three specialty standings.

FIS Alpine Ski Europa Cup
Overall: 1997, 1998 
Downhill: 1997, 1998
Super-G: 1997

References

External links
 

1974 births
Living people
Austrian female alpine skiers